Louay Omar Mohammed al-Taei is an Iraqi  medical doctor accused of murdering wounded policemen, soldiers and officials in Kirkuk while pretending to treat them.

According to police, Louay administered anti-coagulants to pro-Coalition forces brought into the hospital for treatment, to excaberate their bleeding and causing a number of deaths. A police investigation revealed that he had killed 43 people from October 2005 to March 2006. He claimed to be recruited into Jamaat Ansar al-Sunna in August 2005.

He was arrested after Malla Yassin was arrested in early 2006, and confessed to being the leader of an insurgent cell that included Louay.

See also
List of serial killers by country
List of serial killers by number of victims

References

Iraqi insurgency (2003–2011)
Iraqi serial killers
Living people
Male serial killers
Medical practitioners convicted of murdering their patients
Medical serial killers
Poisoners
Year of birth missing (living people)